In metalworking, a fuller is a tool used to form metal when hot.  The fuller has a rounded, either cylindrical or parabolic, nose, and may either have a handle (an "upper fuller") or a shank (a "lower fuller").  The shank of the lower fuller allows the fuller to be inserted into the hardy hole of the anvil.  Upper fullers furthermore come in "straight" or "cross" varieties, depending on the orientation of the handle relative to the face.  

The fuller is a forging tool, used to spread the metal.  The fuller is placed against the metal stock, and then either the fuller (for an upper fuller) or the stock (for a lower fuller) is struck with a hammer.  The rounded nose of the fuller spreads the metal more efficiently than the flat face of the hammer. The process leaves ridges in the stock, which may then be flattened out later with the hammer or other tools. "Fullering," more generally, refers to any forging process creating a sharp transition in cross-dimensional area; with care, some types of fullering can be achieved using only hammer and the edge of the anvil (which acts as the fuller).

See also
 Fuller (groove), a groove on a blade often created by fullering
 Swaging

References

Metalworking hand tools
Press tools